Bucking the Tiger is a 1921 American silent drama film directed by Henry Kolker and starring Conway Tearle, Winifred Westover and Gladden James.

Cast
 Conway Tearle as Ritchie MacDonald
 Winifred Westover as Emily Dwyer
 Gladden James as Ralph Graham
 Helen Montrose as Skaguay Belle 
 Harry Lee as Andy Walsh
 George A. Wright as The Count
Templar Saxe as William Hillyer

References

Bibliography
 Munden, Kenneth White. The American Film Institute Catalog of Motion Pictures Produced in the United States, Part 1. University of California Press, 1997.

External links
 

1921 films
1921 drama films
1920s English-language films
American silent feature films
Silent American drama films
American black-and-white films
Films directed by Henry Kolker
Selznick Pictures films
1920s American films